St. Luke's Episcopal Church is a historic Episcopal church located at 6th and Chestnut Streets in Lebanon, Lebanon County, Pennsylvania.

The cornerstone of the church was laid on St. Luke's Day, October 18, 1879 by Bishop Howe. The church was built in 1880. It was designed by New York architect Henry Martyn Congdon (1834–1922) in the Ruskinian gothic style. It was paid for by iron baron Robert Habersham Coleman and dedicated in memory of J. Lillie Coleman (née Clark), his recently deceased wife.

The building is in the form of a Latin Cross and constructed of native bluestone and sandstone. The roof is covered in rows of blue and red slate.

It was added to the National Register of Historic Places in 1974.

The church was originally incorporated as "Christ Church, of Lebanon, Pa." in 1859, and admitted that year to the Convention of the Diocese of Pennsylvania. The name of the church was changed in 1865 to the current name, "St. Luke's".

References

Episcopal churches in Pennsylvania
Churches on the National Register of Historic Places in Pennsylvania
Gothic Revival church buildings in Pennsylvania
Churches completed in 1880
19th-century Episcopal church buildings
Churches in Lebanon County, Pennsylvania
National Register of Historic Places in Lebanon County, Pennsylvania